James Carnegie, 9th Earl of Southesk, KT, DL (16 November 1827 – 21 February 1905) was a Scottish nobleman, explorer and poet.

Early life
Born in Edinburgh, on 16 November 1827, Southesk was the son of Sir James Carnegie, 5th Baronet and Charlotte Lysons, daughter of the Reverend Daniel Lysons.

Through his great-great-great grandfather, who was the fourth son of David Carnegie, 1st Earl of Southesk, James was the heir to the earldom of Southesk and the lordship of Carnegie.  The fifth earl was involved in the Jacobite rising of 1715 and was attainted, with his titles and estates forfeited. However, in 1855 Sir James Carnegie obtained a reversal of his kinsman's attainder by Act of Parliament and became the ninth Earl of Southesk.

He attended the Edinburgh Academy, received his military training at the Royal Military Academy Sandhurst and in 1845 joined the 92nd Regiment of Foot, before transferring to the Grenadier Guards the next year, with whom he served for three years. In 1849, he was appointed Lord Lieutenant of Kincardineshire, a position he continued to hold until 1856, when he sold his lands in Kincardineshire.

Career
On 30 January 1849, he succeeded as the  6th Baronet Carnegie, of Pittarrow, co. Kincardine in the Baronetage of Nova Scotia. On 2 July 1855, after the original precedence by reversal by Act of Parliament of the Act of Attainder, he succeeded as the  9th Lord Carnegie of Kinnaird, the  9th Lord Carnegie of Kinnaird and Leuchars, and the  9th Earl of Southesk, all in the Peerage of Scotland.

On 7 December 1869, he was created  1st Baron Balinhard, of Farnell, Forfar in the Peerage of the United Kingdom. He held the office of Deputy Lieutenant of Forfarshire.

1859 North American expedition

In 1859, after the death of his first wife, the Earl was advised that to improve his health he should travel to a place where he could live an open-air life and hunt.  In 1859, at the age of 32, he embarked on a trip to the Hudson's Bay Company (HBC) trading area, which later became western Canada.

Southesk left Liverpool on 15 April 1859 on a Cunard paddle-wheeler called the Africa for North America.  Eventually, he ended up in St. Paul, Minnesota, the jumping-off point for his expedition, and then continued on north to Fort Garry, the HBC's western headquarters in the Red River Colony.  In June, Southesk, headed out west and over the next seven months, the expedition travelled more than 4,000 kilometres across the northern prairies to the Rocky Mountains. The plan was to head west out of Fort Garry into Rupert's Land, to hunt bears and bison. He arrived at Fort Edmonton on 1 August. At the fort he paused to buy horses, hired a Métis guide called Antoine Blandoine and built enough pack saddles to haul his outfit into the mountains west of the future site of Cadomin to pursue bighorn sheep. The journey, in early September, took the expedition up the Athabasca River to the McLeod River and finally, the Medicine Tent River, noting that he was now in country that, "no European had ever seen, where bears and wild sheep were certain to be abundant." The expedition then crossed over Southesk Pass, to the Kootenay Plains of the North Saskatchewan River valley, in present-day Alberta. The expedition followed the Siffleur River, crossed over the Pipestone Pass, and followed the Pipestone River to the Bow River.  After camping near Cascade Mountain, the Earl nearly crossed paths with another explorer, James Hector, at a time when there were very few Europeans in the Canadian Rockies.
On the expedition, the Earl of Southesk climbed a mountain, located 6 km north of Mount Southesk and erected a cairn on top that can still be seen today. He wrote in his journal, "I am the first European who has visited this valley, and if I might have the geographic honour of giving my name to some spot of earth, I should choose the mountain near which the two rivers rise."

For the expedition he employed a number of Métis guides and scouts: James McKay, John McKay, George Klyne, John "Piscan" Munroe, Baptiste La Grace, James "Little Dog" Short, Antoine Blandion, Pierre Desnomme, Thomas Arinwakena, and Duncan Robertson. These men were experienced buffalo hunters. During this trip which took him west to Fort Edmonton and into the Rocky Mountains he commissioned and collected several Métis and aboriginal artifacts.

While on his trip, the Earl received considerable support from the HBC. HBC Governor Sir George Simpson helped the Earl arrange for guides, supplies and horses. He gave the Earl a map and instructed HBC employees to show him "every attention".

In 1875 he wrote, Saskatchewan and the Rocky Mountains, which describes his travels.

An exhibit dedicated to the Earl's prairie and mountain trip, including a life-sized statue of a large plains grizzly bear he killed while on a bison hunt on the nearby prairie, is at Ancient Echoes Interpretive Centre in Herschel, Saskatchewan.

The Southesk Collection at the Royal Alberta Museum 

Throughout the 1859 Canadian expedition, Southesk collected objects made by First Nations and Métis people whom he met in the course of his travels. The artifacts returned home with Southesk to Kinnaird Castle, the family estate in Scotland where they remained for the next 146 years, until 2006, when the earl's descendants put them up for auction at Sotheby's in New York.

The Royal Alberta Museum purchased many of the items put up for sale. for $1.1 million. Although relatively small, the Southesk collection is historically significant given that objects from the northern Plains dating to the 1850s are rare and that many of the artifacts are of exceptional quality.  Although modest in size, the collection includes work from at least five distinct cultures: Plains Cree, Blackfoot, Métis, Nakoda and Anishnaabe. The  subsequently donated five additional items linked with the collection.

Publications

Novels

Herminius: a romance. (1862)
Suomiria: a fantasy (1899)

Short fiction

Some Sort of Madness [excerpt] (1982) [only as by Earl of Southesk]

Non-Fiction

Saskatchewan and the Rocky Mountains: a diary and narrative of travel, sport, and adventure, during a journey through the Hudson's Bay Company's territories, in 1859 and 1860. (1875)
Origins of Pictish symbolism; with notes on the sun boar and a new reading of the Newton inscriptions.  (1893)
The Ogham Inscriptions of Scotland. (1885)
Britain's art paradise; or, Notes on some pictures in the Royal Academy, (1871)

Poetry

Lurida lumina. (1876)
The Burial of Isis, and other poems. (1884)
Jonas Fisher, a poem in brown and white. (1875)
Greenwood's farewell and other poems.  (1876)
The Meda Maiden, and other poems. (1877)

Catalogues

Catalogue of the collection of antique gems formed by James, ninth earl of Southesk, K.T.; edited by his daughter Lady Helena Carnegie.  (1908)
The letter archive of James Carnegie, 9th Earl of Southesk, and the Pictish symbol stones of Aberdeenshire; Lynda McGuigan. (2020)

Personal life 
On 19 June 1849, Sir James married Lady Catherine Hamilton Noel (1829–1855) at Exton Park, Rutland, England. Lady Catherine was the second daughter of Charles Noel, 1st Earl of Gainsborough and, his third wife, Annabella Hamlyn-Williams (second daughter of Sir James Hamlyn-Williams, 2nd Baronet of Clovelly Court). Before Catherine's death in 1855, at the age of twenty-six, they had one son and three daughters:

 Lady Arabella Charlotte Carnegie (1850–1907), who married Samuel Romilly, DL, the paternal grandson of Samuel Romilly and maternal grandson of Gilbert Elliot-Murray-Kynynmound, 2nd Earl of Minto. They had four children.
 Lady Constance Mary Carnegie (1851–1909), who married Victor Bruce, 9th Earl of Elgin. They had issue.
 Lady Beatrice Diana Cecilia Carnegie (1852–1934), who married Rev. Henry Holmes Stewart, Rector of Michaelston-le-Pit and son of James Stewart of Cairnsmore.
 Charles Noel Carnegie, 10th Earl of Southesk (1854–1941), who married Ethel Mary Elizabeth Bannerman, the only child of Sir Alexander Bannerman, 9th Baronet and Lady Arabella Diana Sackville-West (the youngest daughter of Lord Chamberlain George Sackville-West, 5th Earl De La Warr and Elizabeth Sackville-West, Countess De La Warr).

In 1860, Lord Southesk married Lady Susan Catherine Mary Murray (1837–1915), eldest daughter of Alexander, Earl of Dunmore. They had three sons and four daughters, including:

 Sir Lancelot Douglas Carnegie (1861–1933), who married Marion Alice de Gournay Barclay, youngest daughter of Henry Ford Barclay in 1890, and had issue.
 Lady Dora Susan Carnegie (1863–1952), who married Maj. Ernest de Rodakowski-Rivers, son of General Josef de Rodakowski by his wife Ottilia, Countess Wrangel.
 Lady Elizabeth Erica Carnegie (1864–1897), who died unmarried.
 Lady Helena Mariota Carnegie (1865–1943), who died unmarried.
 Lady Katherine Agnes Blanche Carnegie (1867–1949), who married Courtenay Morgan, 1st Viscount Tredegar. Had issue.
 Hon. Robert Francis Carnegie (1869–1947), who married Violet Mabel Fraser, second daughter of Philip Affleck Fraser, 18th of Reelig, and Augusta Zella Webb (eldest daughter and heiress of William Frederick Webb). 
 Hon. David Wynford Carnegie (1871–1900), an explorer who died unmarried.

Lord Southesk died on 21 February 1905, aged seventy-seven while at his home in Kinnaird Castle in Scotland. He was succeeded by his son from his first marriage, Charles Noel Carnegie.

Legacy and honours
Fellow of the Royal Geographical Society (1860)
Knight of the Order of the Thistle. (1869) on Prime Minister Gladstone's recommendation.
Honorary LL.D. from St. Andrews. (1872)
Honorary LL.D. from Aberdeen University. (1875)

References

External links

 The Lost Statue of the Earl of Southesk
Kinnaird Castle
Fort Edmonton Park
Royal Alberta Museum
Ancient Echoes Interpretive Centre

1827 births
1905 deaths
People educated at Edinburgh Academy
Earls of Southesk
Lord-Lieutenants of Kincardineshire
Knights of the Thistle
Exploration of Canada
Peers of the United Kingdom created by Queen Victoria